The BYU Centennial Carillon is a bell tower containing a carillon on the campus of Brigham Young University (BYU) in Provo, Utah, United States.

Description
The bell tower was dedicated in October 1975 to commemorate the 100th anniversary of the school's founding. The carillon contains 52 bells and the bells range in size from 25 lbs to 4,730 lbs. 

The carillon tolls a tune based on the hymn "Come, Come, Ye Saints," followed by the hour, and tolls a chime on the half-hour. The hour and half-hour strikes are controlled by an automated system. Carillonneurs may also play the instrument by means of a keyboard located directly below the belfry, in a small room reached by a spiral staircase that ascends through the center of the tower.

The carillon was constructed by Paulsen Construction Company with Markham & Markham Architects and Engineers doing the design work. BYU is owned by the Church of Jesus Christ of Latter-day Saints (LDS Church), and its carillon is the only such instrument the church owns. LDS churches rarely feature bell towers, and the only temple to contain even a single bell is the Nauvoo Illinois Temple.

See also
 List of carillons in the United States

References

External links

Towers completed in 1975
Brigham Young University buildings
Bell towers in the United States
Carillons
Tourist attractions in Provo, Utah
1975 establishments in Utah